Caloptilia plagata is a moth of the family Gracillariidae. It is known from Queensland and the Northern Territory, Australia.

References

plagata
Moths of Australia
Moths described in 1862